The Voice UK is a British television music competition to find new singing talent. The fourth series started on 10 January 2015. Emma Willis and Marvin Humes return as hosts, alongside coaches will.i.am, Sir Tom Jones, and Ricky Wilson. Kylie Minogue did not return due to touring commitments and was replaced by Rita Ora. On 4 April 2015, Stevie McCrorie was announced the winner of the season making him the first winner to have received an all-chair turn in the blind auditions. This also marks Ricky Wilson's first win as coach.

Coaches

On 22 March 2014, Kylie Minogue confirmed that she would not be returning for another series, however when asked if she would return if filming dates were moved she said "I would have to think about it really seriously as I did for this series".  Two days later, the BBC confirmed that she was not quitting the show. However, on 11 April 2014, Minogue tweeted that she would not be returning and on 23 September, it was announced that Rita Ora would join returning coaches will.i.am, Tom Jones and Ricky Wilson.

Emma Willis and Marvin Humes returned as co-presenters.

Promotion
Promotional photos were released on 18 December 2014, including photos of: the coaches (Wilson, Jones, Ora & will.i.am); the presenters (Willis & Humes); and singular shots of each coach.

On 20 December 2014, the first trailer for the series premiered following the final of Strictly Come Dancing at 19:55. The trailer features the four coaches sitting at a bar, when a crow singing behind them catches their attention. They begin to sing along with the crow until a waiter brings over a cooked chicken that they have ordered. Despite thinking the crow would be annoyed, he continues to sing with the group then joining in.

Teams
Colour key:
  Winner
  Runner-up
  Third place
  Eliminated in the Live shows
  Eliminated in the Knockouts
  Artist was stolen by another coach at the Battles
  Eliminated in the Battles

Blind auditions
Each coach has the length of the artists' performance to decide if they wanted that artist on their team. Should two or more coaches want the same artist, then the artist will choose their coach.

Episode 1 (10 January)
The 90-minute premiere of the series was broadcast on 10 January 2015 from 7.00pm until 8.30pm. This was the first year that the first act got less than 4 turns.

Group performance: The Voice UK coaches – "Ready to Go"

Episode 2 (17 January)
The second episode was broadcast on 17 January 2015, and 85 minutes long, airing from 7.00pm until 8.25pm.

Episode 3 (24 January)
The third episode was broadcast on 24 January 2015, and 85 minutes long, broadcast from 7.00pm until 8.25pm.

Episode 4 (31 January)
The fourth episode was broadcast on 31 January 2015, and was 90 minutes long, airing from 7.00pm until 8.30pm.

Episode 5 (7 February)
The fifth episode was broadcast on 7 February 2015, and was 85 minutes long, airing from 7.15pm until 8.40pm.

Episode 6 (14 February)
The sixth episode was broadcast on 14 February 2015, and was 80 minutes long, airing from 7.15pm until 8.35pm.

Episode 7 (21 February)
The seventh episode was broadcast on 21 February 2015, and was 85 minutes long, airing from 7.00pm until 8.25pm.

Battle rounds
The battle rounds will consist of two 2 hour shows on 28 February and 7 March. In a change for the fourth series, the coaches will be allowed to steal two artists each, as opposed to just the one in the previous two series. The eighth episode was 120 minutes long, and aired from 7.15pm until 9.15pm and The ninth episode was 120 minutes long, and aired from 7.30pm until 9.30pm.

Colour key

Knockout rounds
The Knockout rounds aired on 14 and 15 March 2015. Teams of 8 after the battles were stripped down to 3 for the live shows. The tenth episode was 75 minutes long, and aired from 7.15pm until 8.30pm and eleventh episode was 75 minutes long, and aired from 7.45pm until 9.00pm.

Colour key:

Live shows
The live shows began on 21 March 2015 and ended on 4 April 2015. The quarter-final featured performances from Jermain Jackman & Olly Murs, while Jess Glynne & Sia performed on the semi-final. The final featured performances from Charles Hamilton and Rita Ora, Paloma Faith & The Script.

Results summary
Team’s colour key
 Team Will
 Team Rita
 Team Tom
 Team Ricky
Result's colour key
 Artist given 'Fast Pass' by their coach and did not face the public vote
 Artist received the fewest votes and was eliminated 
 Artist won the competition

Live show details

Week 1: Quarter-final (21 March)
After all three artists from each team have performed, the coach will then have to decide which artist they want to give a "fast pass" to and put straight through to the semi-final. The voting lines for the remaining artists will then open after all twelve artists have performed, in a format change compared to previous series, the four artists with the fewest votes, regardless of which team, will leave the competition.

The first part of the show was 115 minutes long, and aired from 7.30pm until 9.25pm. The second part was 35 minutes long, and aired from 9.35pm until 10.10pm.

Group performance: The Voice UK coaches ("Unbelievable")
Special musical guests: Jermain Jackman ("How Will I Know") and Olly Murs ("Seasons")

Week 2: Semi-final (28 March)
After all eight artists from each team have performed, the four artists with the most viewer votes advance to the live final, regardless of their team. Because of the format change, with the eliminations of Karis Thomas and Joe Woolford, Rita Ora no longer has any artists remaining on her team. She became the first coach in The Voice UK history to not have an artist in the final.

This episode was 125 minutes long and aired from 7.00pm until 9.05pm.
Group performances: Team Tom with Tom Jones ("River Deep - Mountain High"), Team Rita with Rita Ora ("Rude"), Team Will with will.i.am ("That's the Way (I Like It)"/"Get Down Tonight"), and Team Ricky with Ricky Wilson ("Stay With Me")
Special musical guests: Jess Glynne ("Hold My Hand") and Sia ("Elastic Heart")

Week 3: Final (4 April)

This episode was 130 minutes long, and aired from 7.00pm until 9.10pm.

Special musical guests: Charles Hamilton and Rita Ora ("New York Raining"), Paloma Faith ("Beauty Remains"), The Script ("Man on Wire")

Reception

Ratings

References

External links 
 

Series 04
2015 British television seasons